A purser is the person on a ship principally responsible for the handling of money on board. On modern merchant ships, the purser is the officer responsible for all administration (including the ship's cargo and passenger manifests) and supply. Frequently, the cooks and stewards answer to the purser as well. They were also called a pusser in British naval slang.

History
The purser joined the warrant officer ranks of the Royal Navy in the early 14th century and existed as a naval rank until 1852. The development of the warrant officer system began in 1040, when five English ports began furnishing warships to King Edward the Confessor in exchange for certain privileges. They also furnished crews whose officers were the Master, Boatswain, Carpenter and Cook. Later these officers were "warranted" by the British Admiralty. Pursers received no pay but were entitled to profits made through their business activities. In the 18th century a purser would buy his warrant for £65 and was required to post sureties totalling £2,100 with the Admiralty. They maintained and sailed the ships and were the standing officers of the navy, staying with the ships in port between voyages as caretakers supervising repairs and refitting.

In charge of supplies such as food and drink, clothing, bedding, candles, the purser was originally known as "the clerk of burser." They would usually charge the supplier a 5% commission for making a purchase and it is recorded they charged a considerable markup when they resold the goods to the crew. The purser was not in charge of pay, but he had to track it closely since the crew had to pay for all their supplies, and it was the purser's job to deduct those expenses from their wages. The purser bought everything (except food and drink) on credit, acting as an unofficial private merchant. In addition to his official responsibilities, it was customary for the purser to act as an official private merchant for luxuries such as tobacco and to be the crew's banker.

As a result, the purser could be at risk of losing money and being thrown into debtor's prison; conversely, the crew and officers habitually suspected the purser of making an illicit profit out of his complex dealings. It was the common practice of pursers forging pay tickets to claim wages for "phantom" crew members that led to the Navy's implementation of muster inspection to confirm who worked on a vessel. The position, though unpaid, was very sought after because of the expectation of making a reasonable profit; although there were wealthy pursers, it was from side businesses facilitated by their ships' travels.

On modern-day passenger ships, the purser has evolved into a multiperson office that handles general administration, fees and charges, currency exchange, and any other money-related needs of the passengers and crew.

Aircraft 
On modern airliners, the cabin manager (chief flight attendant) is often called the purser. The purser oversees the flight attendants by making sure airline passengers are safe and comfortable. A flight purser completes detailed reports and verifies all safety procedures are followed.

See also 

 Neerja Bhanot, purser on Pan Am Flight 73
 Bursar, etymological cognate used in an academic context
 Samuel Hambleton (naval officer), the first purser of the United States Navy
 Navy Supply Corps

Notes

References
 Armstrong, William E. (1966). Purser's Handbook. New York: Cornell Maritime Press.
 Hill, Charles E. (1941). Purser's Manual and Marine Store-Keeping.  New York: Cornell Maritime Press
 Perry, Hobart S. (1931). Ship Management and Operation. New York: Simmons Boardman Publishing.
 

Marine occupations
Nautical terminology
Occupations in aviation